Su adorable majadero ("His Adorable Fool") is a 1938 Mexican film. It stars Sara García.

External links
 

1938 films
1930s Spanish-language films
Mexican black-and-white films
Mexican comedy-drama films
1938 comedy-drama films
1930s Mexican films